Dmitry Khovratovich is a cryptographer, currently a Lead Cryptographer for the Dusk Network, researcher for the Ethereum Foundation, and member of the International Association for Cryptologic Research. He developed, together with Alex Biryukov, the Equihash proof-of-work algorithm which is currently being used as consensus mechanism for the Zcash cryptocurrency, and the Argon2 key derivation function, which won the Password Hashing Competition in July 2015.

He is the publisher of several cryptanalysis papers for a number of mainstream cyphers, such as the first cryptanalytic attack on full-round AES-192 and AES-256 which is faster than a brute-force attack, an attack on the RadioGatún cryptographic primitive, and also the current best cryptanalysis on Skein, a candidate for the SHA-3 competition.

In 2014, he published a research about the deanonymisation of clients in the Bitcoin P2P network

Selected publications 
 Egalitarian computing, USENIX 2016, with Alex Biryukov
 Argon2: new generation of memory-hard functions for password hashing and other applications, Euro S&P 2016, with Alex Biryukov and Daniel Dinu
 Equihash: Asymmetric Proof-of-Work Based on the Generalized Birthday Problem, NDSS 2016, with Alex Biryukov
 Tradeoff Cryptanalysis of Memory-Hard Functions, Asiacrypt 2015, with Alex Biryukov
 Rotational Cryptanalysis of ARX Revisited, FSE 2015, with Ivica Nikolic, Josef Pieprzyk, Przemyslaw Sokolowski, Ron Steinfeld
 Cryptographic Schemes Based on the ASASA Structure: Black-Box, White-Box, and Public-Key, Asiacrypt 2014, with Alex Biryukov and Charles Bouillaguet
 Deanonymisation of Clients in Bitcoin P2P Network, ACM CCS 2014 with Alex Biryukov and Ivan Pustogarov
 Collision Spectrum, Entropy Loss, T-Sponges, and Cryptanalysis of GLUON-64, FSE 2014, with Leo Perrin
 PAEQ: Parallelizable Permutation-Based Authenticated Encryption, ISC 2014, with Alex Biryukov
 Key Wrapping with a Fixed Permutation, CT-RSA 2014.
 Bicliques for Permutations: Collision and Preimage Attacks in Stronger Settings, Asiacrypt'12, 2012
 New Preimage Attacks against Reduced SHA-1, Crypto'12, 2012. With Simon Knellwolf
 Narrow-Bicliques: Cryptanalysis of the Full IDEA, Eurocrypt'12, 2012. With Gaetan Leurent and Christian Rechberger
 Bicliques for Preimages: Attacks on Skein-512 and the SHA-2 Family, FSE'12, 2012. With Christian Rechberger and Alexandra Savelieva
 Biclique Cryptanalysis of the Full AES, Asiacrypt'11, 2011. With Andrey Bogdanov and Christian Rechberger
 Rotational Rebound Attacks on Reduced Skein, Asiacrypt'10, 2010. With Ivica Nikolic and Christian Rechberger
 Rotational Cryptanalysis of ARX, FSE'10, 2010. With Ivica Nikolic
 Key Recovery Attacks of Practical Complexity on AES Variants With Up To 10 Rounds. With Alex Biryukov, Orr Dunkelman, Nathan Keller, and Adi Shamir
 Related-Key Attack on the Full AES-192 and AES-256. With Alex Biryukov
 Meet-in-the-Middle Attacks on SHA-3 Candidates. FSE'2009. With Ralf-Philipp Weinmann and Ivica Nikolić

Awards 
 Winner of LuxBlockHackathon 2017
 Winner of Password Hashing Competition (2014–2015)
 Best Paper Award Asiacrypt 2010
 Best PhD Thesis, University of Luxembourg (2012)

External links 
 The Password Hashing Competition website
 Zcash website
 Dusk Network website

References 

Year of birth missing (living people)
Living people
Moscow State University alumni
Russian cryptographers